Initiative for Catalonia Greens (ICV) was an eco-socialist political party in Catalonia. It was formed as a merger of Iniciativa per Catalunya and Els Verds. IC had been an alliance led by Partit Socialista Unificat de Catalunya and was the equivalent of Izquierda Unida in Catalonia. IC later developed into a political party, and PSUC was dissolved.

The youth of ICV was called Joves d'Esquerra Verda (Green Left Youth). It used to be called JambI, Joves amb Iniciativa (Youth with Initiative).

In the elections to the European Parliament in 2004 ICV ran on the Izquierda Unida list. One MEP, Raül Romeva, was elected from ICV which joined the Green Group.

The ICV formed part of the past ruling tripartite coalition (along with the Socialist Party of Catalonia and the Republican Left of Catalonia, a left-wing Catalan Nationalist Party) in the Generalitat of Catalonia. The coalition governed Catalonia from 2004-2010. ICV was given responsibility for the Ministry of the Environment in the share-out of power in the new government.

Initiative for Catalonia Greens had an agreement of mutual association with Equo.
It was dissolved in 2019. In July 2020 it was announced that the party would be re-founded as Green Left.

Ideology 
Iniciativa per Catalunya Verds called itself an "ecosocialist" party and its members were therefore "ecosocialists". This ideology is summarized in the book The Ecosocialist Manifesto, co-written by a number of left-wing green politicians. This ideology looks to renew the left and is firmly against communism as practised in the former Soviet Union and against capitalism, as practised by Margaret Thatcher and Ronald Reagan, but also against social democracy, which it considers as only a lesser evil that does not respond to the environmental and social challenges ahead. From an ecosocialist point of view, both communism and capitalism are two faces of the productivist "mode of production" (a Marxist term), which should be phased out if the ecological health of  the planet is to survive. The manifesto also considers this ideology to be deeply feminist and in favour of the "freedom of the European peoples" (i.e. for self-determination for the Basque Country, Galicia or Catalonia). The party voted in favour of the Catalan parliament's declaration defining Catalonia as a "sovereign political and juridical entity" ("subjecte polític i jurídic sobirà") in 2013.

Presidents
 Rafael Ribó i Massó (1987–2000)
 Joan Saura (2000–present)

Electoral results

Spanish Parliament

Congress of Deputies

Catalan Parliament

European Parliament

See also 

Green party
Green politics
List of environmental organizations
Politics of Catalonia

References

External links
Iniciativa per Catalunya Verds web site (in Catalan)

1987 establishments in Spain
Catalan nationalism
Ecosocialist parties
European Green Party
Global Greens member parties
Green political parties in Spain
Political parties established in 1987
Political parties in Catalonia
Socialist parties in Catalonia